Adamski (feminine: Adamska, plural: Adamscy) is a Polish surname, it may refer to:

 Antoni Adamski (1932–2001), Polish field hockey player
 David Adamski, American entomologist
 Filip Adamski (born 1983), German rower
 George Adamski (1891–1965), Polish-American who claimed to have had contacts with Venusian extraterrestrials
 Herbert Adamski (1910–1941), German rower
 Ireneusz Adamski, Polish footballer
 Jerzy Adamski (1937–2002), Polish boxer
 Kacper Adamski (born 1992), Polish handball player
 Kazimierz Adamski (born 1964), Polish sculptor
 M. Patricia Adamski, American legal scholar
 Marcin Adamski (born 1975), Polish footballer
 Mariusz Adamski (born 1974), Polish aerial photographer
 Philippe Adamski (born 1985), French orienteering competitor
 Piotr Adamski, Polish model
 Stanisław Adamski (1875–1967), Polish priest, and social and political activist
 Tadeusz Adamski (1922-2001), Polish field hockey player
 Tomasz Adamski (born 1963), Polish punk musician and poet
 Wiesław Adamski (1947–2017), Polish sculptor

References 

Polish-language surnames